This is a list of comedians of British birth or famous mainly in Britain. Many of the comedy panel-game regulars and sitcom actors may not be regarded as comedians by some people but they are included here because this page uses the word "comedian" in its broadest possible sense. Fictional comedians are not included.

Impressionists 

Terry Alderton (born 1970), Spitting Image 
Ronni Ancona (born 1968), Alistair McGowan's Big Impression 
Chris Barrie (born 1960), Spitting Image
Stanley Baxter (born 1926)
Rory Bremner (born 1961)
Faith Brown (born 1944)
Paul Burling (born 1970)
Phil Cool (born 1948)
Brian Conley (born Aug 1961), Alive and Dangerous
Kevin Connelly, Dead Ringers
Jon Culshaw (born 1968), Dead Ringers, 2DTV 
Bobby Davro (born 1958)
Dawn French (born 1957), French and Saunders
Peter Goodwright (1936–2020)
Mike Hayley
Dave Lamb, 2DTV, Goodness Gracious Me
Alistair McGowan (born 1964), Alistair McGowan's Big Impression
Mark Perry, Dead Ringers, 2DTV
Jan Ravens (born 1958), Dead Ringers, 2DTV
Morgana Robinson (born 1982), The Morgana Show
Jennifer Saunders (born 1958), French and Saunders
Debra Stephenson (born 1972), The Impressions Show with Culshaw and Stephenson
Tracey Ullman (born 1959)
Mike Yarwood (born 1941)

Musical comedians 

Adèle Anderson (born 1952)
Bill Bailey (born 1964)
Les Barker (born 1947)
Mitch Benn (born 1970)
Ivor Biggun, pseudonym of Doc Cox (born 1946)
Harriet Braine
Simon Brint (born 1950), comic and composer of themes for numerous TV programmes
Doc Brown (born 1980)
Alex Horne (born 1978)
Adam Buxton (born 1969), radio host and television/sketch comedy personality
Jasper Carrott (born 1945)
Edwyn Collins (born 1959), writer and performer on Channel 4's West Heath House and West Heath Yard 
Billy Connolly (born 1942)
Bernard Cribbins (1928–2022)
Ivor Cutler (1923–2006)
Angus Deayton (born 1956), member of The Hee Bee Gee Bees 
Richard Digance (born 1949)
Graham Fellows, aka John Shuttleworth (born 1959)
Noel Fielding (born 1973)
Flanders and Swann (Michael Flanders 1922–1975; Donald Swann 1923–1994)
Jay Foreman
Boothby Graffoe (born 1962)
John Hegley (born 1953), also performs as half of the Popticians
Rainer Hersch
Hinge and Bracket
Neil Innes (1944–2019)
 Sid Kipper (born Chris Sugden in 1952), also performed as half of the Kipper Family 
Andrew Lawrence
Gary Le Strange, aka Waen Shepherd (born 1971)
Tim Minchin (born 1975)
Bill Oddie (born 1941)
Earl Okin (born 1947)
Mike Harding (born 1944)
Philip Pope, comic actor and composer of TV theme tunes
Rowland Rivron (born 1958), drummer in comedy band Raw Sex and presenter of BBC Radio 2's Jammin
Chris Sievey, aka Frank Sidebottom (1955–2010)
Vivian Stanshall (1943–1995)
Jim Tavaré (born 1963)
Jake Thackray (1938–2002)
Victoria Wood (1953–2016)

Variety and music hall comedians 

Chesney Allen (1893–1982)
Arthur Askey (1900–1982)
Charles Austin (1878–1942)
Hylda Baker (1905–1986)
Michael Barrymore (born 1957)
George Beauchamp (1862–1900)
Harry Bedford (1873–1939)
Billy Bennett (1887–1942)
Issy Bonn (1903–1977)
Max Bygraves (1922–2012)
Frank Carson (1926–2012)
Billy Caryll and Hilda Mundy
Roy Castle (1932–1994)
Clapham and Dwyer
Collinson and Dean
Tommy Cooper (1921–1984)
Tom Costello (1863–1943)
Jimmy Cricket (born 1945)
Leslie Crowther (1933–1996)
Billy Danvers (1886–1964)
Les Dawson (1931–1993)
Ken Dodd (1927–2018)
Charlie Drake (1925–2006)
Dick Emery (1915–1983)
Will Evans (1866–1931)
Fayne and Evans
Sid Field (1904–1950)
Bud Flanagan (1896–1968)
Cyril Fletcher (1913–2005)
George Formby (1904–1961)
Bruce Forsyth (1928–2017)
Ken Goodwin (1933–2012)
Haver and Lee
Arthur Haynes (1914–1966)
Dick Henderson (1891–1958)
Dickie Henderson (1922–1985)
Frankie Howerd (1917–1992)
Rex Jameson ("Mrs Shufflewick") (1924–1983)
Yootha Joyce (1927–1980)
Jimmy James (1892–1965)
Kenway and Young
Jimmy Learmouth (1888–1921)
Ray Martine (1928–2002)
Bill Maynard (1928–2018)
Max Miller (1894–1963)
Spike Milligan (1918–2002)
Nat Mills and Bobbie
Bob Monkhouse (1928–2003)
Morecambe and Wise (Eric Morecambe 1926–1984; Ernie Wise 1925–1999)
Dave Morris (1896–1960)
Murray and Mooney
Des O'Connor (1932–2020)
Tom O'Connor (1939–2021)
Edmund Payne (1863–1914)
Frank Randle (1901–1957)
Revnell and West
Ted Rogers (1935–2001)
George Roper (1934–2003)
Billy Russell (1893–1971)
Suzette Tarri (1881–1955)
Tommy Trinder (1908–1989)
Vesta Victoria (1873–1951)
Max Wall (1908–1990)
Elsie and Doris Waters
Jimmy Wheeler (1910–1973)
Charlie Williams (1927–2006)
Robb Wilton (1881–1957)
Wee Georgie Wood (1894–1979)

Radio comedians 

Michael Bentine (1922–1996), The Goon Show
Dick Bentley (1907–1995), Take It From Here
Tim Brooke-Taylor (1940–2020), I'm Sorry, I'll Read That Again, I'm Sorry I Haven't a Clue
John Cleese (born 1939), I'm Sorry, I'll Read That Again
Jimmy Edwards (1920–1988), Take It From Here
Kenny Everett (1944–1995)
Graham Fellows (born 1959), plays the characters Jilted John, John Shuttleworth and Brian Appleton
John Finnemore (born 1977), Cabin Pressure, John Finnemore's Souvenir Programme
Cyril Fletcher (1913–2005)
Ronald Frankau (1894–1951)
Graeme Garden (born 1943), I'm Sorry, I'll Read That Again, I'm Sorry I Haven't a Clue
Jeff Green (born 1964)
Joyce Grenfell (1910–1979)
Deryck Guyler (1914–1999)
Tony Hancock (1924–1968), Hancock's Half Hour
Tommy Handley (1892–1949), It's That Man Again
David Hatch (1939–2007), I'm Sorry, I'll Read That Again
Leonard Henry (1890–1973)
Jon Holmes (born 1973), Listen Against, The Now Show
Kenneth Horne (1907–1969), Round the Horne, Beyond Our Ken
Roy Hudd (1936–2020), The News Huddlines
Jo Kendall (1938–2022), I'm Sorry, I'll Read That Again, I'm Sorry I Haven't a Clue
Harry Korris (1891–1971)
Bill Kerr (1922–2014), Hancock's Half Hour
Victor Lewis-Smith (born 1959)  Loose Ends
Betty Marsden (1919–1998)
Spike Milligan (1918–2002), The Goon Show
Robert Moreton (1922–1957)
Chris Morris (born 1962), On the Hour
Richard Murdoch (1907–1990), Much-Binding-in-the-Marsh
Stephen Murray (1912–1983), The Navy Lark
Joy Nichols (1925–1992), Take It From Here
Bill Oddie (born 1941), I'm Sorry, I'll Read That Again
Hugh Paddick (1915–2000)
Bill Pertwee (1926–2013), Beyond Our Ken, Round the Horne
Jon Pertwee (1919–1996), The Navy Lark
Leslie Phillips (1924–2022), The Navy Lark
Dennis Price (1915–1973), The Navy Lark
Ted Ray (1905–1977), Meet Me Tonight, Carry On Teacher
Al Read (1909–1987)
Harry Secombe (1921–2001), The Goon Show
Peter Sellers (1925–1980), The Goon Show
Mark Steel (born 1960), The Mark Steel Solution, The Mark Steel Revolution, The Mark Steel Lectures
Kenneth Williams (1926–1988), Round the Horne

Satirists 

Douglas Adams (1952–2001)
Michael "Atters" Attree (born 1965)
Ikenna Azuike (born 1979)
John Bird (born 1936), Bremner, Bird and Fortune
Eleanor Bron (born 1938)
Munya Chawawa (born 1992)
Peter Cook (1937–1995)
John Fortune (1939–2013), Bremner, Bird and Fortune 
Ian Hislop (born 1960), Private Eye
Jon Holmes (born 1973)
Rosie Holt
Armando Iannucci (born 1963)
Nish Kumar, The Mash Report, Hello America
Victor Lewis-Smith (born 1959) Inside Victor Lewis-Smith
Chris Morris (born 1962), Brass Eye
John Oliver (born 1977), Last Week Tonight with John Oliver
William Rushton (1937–1996)
Michael Spicer
Mark Thomas (born 1963), The Mark Thomas Comedy Product
Tom Walker, "Jonathan Pie"

Comedy panel game regulars

A
James Acaster, Russell Howard's Good News Extra, Dave's One Night Stand
Chris Addison, Mock the Week
Simon Amstell, Never Mind the Buzzcocks, Popworld
Clive Anderson, Have I Got News for You, QI
Richard Ayoade, The IT Crowd, The Mighty Boosh, Nathan Barley

B
Bill Bailey, Never Mind the Buzzcocks, Space Cadets, QI
Frankie Boyle, Mock the Week, Argumental, Would I Lie to You?
Jo Brand, QI, Have I Got News for You
Russell Brand, The Big Fat Quiz of the Year
Rory Bremner, Mock the Week, Whose Line Is It Anyway?
Kevin Bridges, Stand Up for the Week, Michael McIntyre's Comedy Roadshow
Marcus Brigstocke, Argumental, QI
Tim Brooke-Taylor, I'm Sorry I Haven't a Clue
Rob Brydon, QI, Rob Brydon's Annually Retentive, The Big Fat Quiz of the Year, Would I Lie to You?

C
Susan Calman, The News Quiz
Alan Carr, The Sunday Night Project, The Friday Night Project, Alan Carr's Celebrity Ding Dong, Alan Carr: Chatty Man
Jimmy Carr, 8 out of 10 Cats, Distraction, QI, The Big Fat Quiz of the Year
Craig Charles, Space Cadets
Daisy May Cooper, 8 out of 10 Cats, Would I Lie to You?
Alan Coren, The News Quiz, Call My Bluff
Barry Cryer, I'm Sorry I Haven't a Clue

D
Alan Davies, QI
Les Dawson, TV comic
Angus Deayton, Would I Lie to You?, former chair of Have I Got News for You
Jack Dee, It's Only TV...but I Like It, The Big Fat Quiz of the Year,I'm Sorry I haven't a Clue,
Hugh Dennis, Mock the Week
Omid Djalili

E
Harry Enfield, Harry Enfield's Television Programme

F
 Noel Fielding, The Mighty Boosh, Never Mind the Buzzcocks, The Big Fat Quiz of the Year, The IT Crowd, Unnatural Acts, Nathan Barley
 Micky Flanagan, Mock The Week, Epic Win, 8 Out of 10 Cats, Was It Something I Said?
Clement Freud, Just a Minute
Stephen Fry, QI, Fry and Laurie, Blackadder

G
Graeme Garden, I'm Sorry I Haven't a Clue
Dave Gorman, Rob Brydon's Annually Retentive, QI, Modern Life is Goodish
Jeff Green, Shoot the Messenger, Jo Brand's Hot Potatoes

H
Andy Hamilton, The News Quiz, Have I Got News for You, QI
Nick Hancock (born 1962), They Think It's All Over
Jeremy Hardy, The News Quiz, If I Ruled the World, QI
Tony Hawks, I'm Sorry I Haven't a Clue
Richard Herring, The 99p Challenge
Ian Hislop, The News Quiz, Have I Got News for You
Simon Hoggart, The News Quiz
Rufus Hound, Argumental
Russell Howard, Mock the Week, Russell Howard's Good News, The Russell Howard Hour
Lee Hurst, They Think It's All Over

I
Richard Ingrams, The News Quiz

J
Milton Jones, Mock The Week, Live at the Apollo
Peter Jones, Just a Minute
Phill Jupitus, Never Mind the Buzzcocks, QI
Miles Jupp, Mock the Week, Have I Got News for You

K
Nish Kumar, Mock the Week, The News Quiz, QI

L
Sean Lock, Have I Got News for You, QI, 8 out of 10 Cats
Josie Long, 8 out of 10 Cats, Never Mind the Buzzcocks
Humphrey Lyttelton, I'm Sorry I Haven't a Clue

M
Lee Mack, Would I Lie to You?
Jason Manford, 8 out of 10 Cats, Would I Lie to You?, Just a Minute, QI, Never Mind the Buzzcocks, Room 101, Celebrity Juice
Arthur Marshall, Call My Bluff
Rory McGrath, They Think It's All Over
Michael McIntyre, 8 out of 10 Cats
Paul Merton, Have I Got News for You
David Mitchell, QI, Would I Lie to You?, Mock the Week, The Big Fat Quiz of the Year, The Bubble, The Unbelievable Truth
Diane Morgan
Robert Morley, Call My Bluff
Frank Muir, Call My Bluff

N
Derek Nimmo, Just a Minute
Ross Noble, Have I Got News for You, QI

P
Andy Parsons, Mock the Week, QI
Sue Perkins, Just a Minute, The News Quiz, The 99p Challenge
Katie Perry, An Audience with Keith Parry, The Paul O'Grady Show

R
Robin Ray, Call My Bluff
Jon Richardson, 8 out of 10 Cats
Jonathan Ross, They Think It's All Over, It's Only TV...but I Like It, Friday Night with Jonathan Ross, The Big Fat Quiz of the Year, The Jonathan Ross Show
Willie Rushton, I'm Sorry I Haven't a Clue

S
Linda Smith, The News Quiz, QI

T
Sandi Toksvig, Call My Bluff, chair of The News Quiz, QI
Barry Took, The News Quiz

W
Mark Watson, Mock the Week
Robert Webb, Argumental
Francis Wheen, The News Quiz
Jack Whitehall, A League of Their Own, Dave's One Night Stand, Mock the Week, 8 out of 10 Cats
Joe Wilkinson, 8 Out of 10 Cats, 8 Out of 10 Cats Does Countdown, Live at the Electric 
Kenneth Williams, Just a Minute

Sketch show/alternative comedians 

The League Of Gentlemen
Mark Gatiss (born 1966)
Steve Pemberton (born 1967)
Reece Shearsmith (born 1969)
Jeremy Dyson (born 1966)
Armstrong and Miller
Alexander Armstrong (born 1970)
Ben Miller (born 1966)
Richard Ayoade (born 1977), Noel Fielding's Luxury Comedy 
James Bachman, That Mitchell and Webb Look, Sorry, I've Got No Head
David Baddiel (born 1964), The Mary Whitehouse Experience, Fantasy Football League 
Matt Berry (born 1974), Snuff Box 
Sanjeev Bhaskar (born 1963), Goodness Gracious Me
Katy Brand (born 1979), Katy Brand's Big Ass Show 
Jasper Carrott (born 1945)
Craig Charles (born 1964)
Olivia Colman (born 1974), Bruiser
Brian Conley (born 1961)
Hugh Dennis (born 1962), The Mary Whitehouse Experience 
Charlie Drake (1925–2006)
Adrian Edmondson (born 1957)
Kevin Eldon (born 1960), Fist of Fun, Big Train, Jam 
Dick Emery (1915–1983)
Harry Enfield (born 1961), Harry Enfield and Chums 
Kenny Everett (1944–1995)
The Fast Show
Caroline Aherne (1963–2016)
Simon Day (born 1962)
Charlie Higson (born 1958)
John Thomson (born 1969)
Arabella Weir (born 1957)
Paul Whitehouse (born 1958)
Mark Williams (born 1959)
Noel Fielding (born 1973), Noel Fielding's Luxury Comedy
Gregor Fisher (born 1953), Naked Video 
Martin Freeman, Bruiser
Dawn French (born 1957), French and Saunders
Stephen Fry (born 1957), A Bit of Fry & Laurie
The Goodies
Tim Brooke-Taylor (1940–2020)
Graeme Garden (born 1943)
Bill Oddie (born 1941)
Anil Gupta, Goodness Gracious Me
Arthur Haynes (1914–1966)
Patricia Hayes (1909–1998)
Lenny Henry (born 1958)
Benny Hill (1924–1992)
Harry Hill (born 1964)
Matthew Holness (born 1975), Bruiser, Garth Marenghi's Darkplace
Dom Joly (born 1967)
Rufus Jones (born 1975)
John Junkin (1930–2006)
Hugh Laurie (born 1959), A Bit of Fry & Laurie
Matt Lucas, Little Britain
Rik Mayall (1958–2014)
Spike Milligan (1918–2002)
David Mitchell (born 1974), That Mitchell and Webb Look
Monty Python
Graham Chapman (1941–1989)
John Cleese (born 1939)
Terry Gilliam (born 1940)
Eric Idle (born 1943)
Terry Jones (1942–2020)
Michael Palin (born 1943)
Morecambe and Wise
Eric Morecambe (1926–1984)
Ernie Wise (1925–1999)
Bob Mortimer (born 1959)
Rob Newman (born 1964), The Mary Whitehouse Experience
Not the Nine O'Clock News
Rowan Atkinson (born 1955)
Griff Rhys Jones (born 1953)
Mel Smith (1952–2013)
Pamela Stephenson (born 1949)
Nicholas Parsons (1923–2020)
Nigel Planer (born 1953)
Steve Punt (born 1962), The Mary Whitehouse Experience
Vic Reeves (born 1959)
Peter Richardson (born 1951), The Comic StripJennifer Saunders (born 1958)
Alexei Sayle (born 1952)
Peter Serafinowicz (born 1972)
Frank Skinner (born 1957)Smack the PonyFiona Allen (born 1965)
Doon Mackichan (born 1962)
Sally Phillips (born 1970)
Laura Solon (born 1979), Ruddy Hell! It's Harry and Paul, Al Murray's Multiple Personality DisorderMeera Syal (born 1961), Goodness Gracious Me, The Kumars at No. 42Catherine Tate (born 1968), The Catherine Tate Show The Two RonniesRonnie Barker (1929–2005)
Ronnie Corbett (1930–2016)
Tracey Ullman (born 1959)
David Walliams (born 1971), Little BritainRobert Webb (born 1972), That Mitchell and Webb Look, BruiserHarry Worth (1917–1989)The Royle Family Caroline Aherne (1963–2016)
 Craig Cash (born 1960)
 Sue Johnston (born 1943)
 Ralf Little (born 1980)
 Liz Smith (1921–2016)
 Ricky Tomlinson (born 1939)

 Film 

Rowan Atkinson (born 1955), Mr Bean's Holiday, Mr Bean, Johnny English, Johnny English RebornRussell Brand, St Trinians, Forgetting Sarah MarshallBernard Bresslaw (1934–1993)
Charlie Chaplin (1889–1977)
John Cleese (born 1939), Monty Python films
Sacha Baron Cohen (born 1971), Ali G, Borat, BrünoRobbie Coltrane (1950–2022)
Steve Coogan (born 1965)
Ade Edmondson, Guest House ParadisoLee Evans (born 1964)
Marty Feldman (1933–1982), Young FrankensteinGeorge Formby (1904–1961)
Martin Freeman (born 1971)
Nick Frost, Shaun of the Dead, Hot FuzzTerry Gilliam (born 1940), Monty Python films
Will Hay (1888–1949)
Eric Idle (born 1943), Monty Python films
Sid James (1913–1976), Carry On films
Terry Jones (1942-2020), Monty Python films
Stan Laurel (1890–1965), half of Laurel and Hardy
Rik Mayall, Drop Dead Fred, Guest House ParadisoMichael Palin (born 1943), Monty Python films
Monty Python
Dudley Moore (1935–2002), Arthur, 10Bill Nighy (born 1949)
Simon Pegg, Shaun of the Dead, Hot FuzzLeonard Rossiter (1926–1984)
Peter Sellers (1925–1980), Dr. Strangelove, Inspector Clouseau films
Alastair Sim (1900–1976), Green for Danger, The Belles of St Trinian'sEric Sykes (1923–2012)
Terry Thomas (1911–1990), The Green Man, Private's Progress, Brothers in LawKenneth Williams (1926–1988), Carry On films
Norman Wisdom (1915–2010)

 Theatrical comedians 
Arthur Lowe (1915–1982), played in the theatre from his debut in 1945 until his death in 1982
Margaret Rutherford (1892–1972), started performing from 1925 at the Old Vic and continued her career till 1966

 Sitcom comedians 

Rowan Atkinson (born 1955), Blackadder, The Thin Blue Line, Mr. Bean
Helen Atkinson-Wood (born 1955), Blackadder the Third, Radio Active radio series
Richard Ayoade (born 1977), Garth Marenghi's Darkplace, The IT CrowdBill Bailey (born 1964), Spaced, Black BooksMorwenna Banks (born 1961), The Thick of It, Ruddy Hell! It's Harry and Paul, SaxondaleRonnie Barker (1929–2005), Porridge, Open All HoursChris Barrie (born 1960), Red Dwarf, The Brittas EmpireNorman Beaton (1934–1994), Desmond's, The FostersRichard Beckinsale (1947–1979), Porridge, Rising DampMatt Berry (born 1974), Garth Marenghi's Darkplace, The IT Crowd, The Mighty BooshJames Bolam (born 1935), The Likely Lads, Only When I LaughRichard Briers (1934–2013), The Good Life, Ever Decreasing CirclesKathy Burke (born 1964), Gimme Gimme GimmePatrick Cargill (1918–1996), Father, Dear FatherJohn Challis (1942-2021), Only Fools and Horses, The Green Green GrassEmma Chambers (1964-2018), The Vicar of DibleyCraig Charles (born 1964), Red DwarfJohn Cleese (born 1939), Fawlty TowersMartin Clunes (born 1961), Men Behaving Badly, Reggie PerrinRonnie Corbett (1930–2016), Sorry!Michael Crawford (born 1942), Some Mothers Do 'Ave 'EmWindsor Davies (1930–2019), It Ain't Half Hot Mum, Never the TwainJulia Davis (born 1966), Nighty NightRichard Dawson (1932–2012), Hogan's HeroesAngus Deayton (born 1956), Nighty Night, One Foot in the GraveJames Dreyfus (born 1968), The Thin Blue Line, My Hero, Gimme Gimme GimmeClive Dunn (1920–2012), Boys Will Be Boys, Dad's ArmyPaul Eddington (1927–1995), The Good Life, Yes MinisterAdrian Edmondson (born 1957), The Young Ones, BottomJimmy Edwards (1920–1988), Whack-O!Noel Fielding (born 1973), The Mighty Boosh, The IT CrowdJames Fleet (born 1952), The Vicar of DibleyJane Freeman (1935–2017), Last of the Summer WineMartin Freeman (born 1971), The Office, HardwareDawn French (born 1957), The Vicar of DibleyNick Frost (born 1972), Spaced, HyperdriveRobert Fyfe (1930–2021), Last of the Summer WineRicky Gervais (born 1961), The Office, ExtrasTamsin Greig (born 1966), Black Books, Green WingDeryck Guyler (1914–1999), Please Sir!, SykesTony Hancock (1924–1968), Hancock's Half HourMiranda Hart (born 1972), MirandaNick Helm (born 1980), UncleJulia Hills (born 1957), 2point4 ChildrenJane Horrocks (born 1964), Absolutely FabulousKarl Howman (born 1952), Brush StrokesPeter Howitt (born 1957), BreadJohn Inman (1935–2007), Are You Being ServedDavid Jason (born 1940), Only Fools and Horses, Open All HoursDanny John-Jules (born 1960), Red DwarfLesley Joseph (born 1945), Birds of a FeatherPeter Kay (born 1973), Phoenix Nights, Max and Paddy's Road to NowhereGorden Kaye (1941–2017), 'Allo 'Allo!Penelope Keith (born 1940), The Good Life, To the Manor BornBelinda Lang (born 1953), 2point4 ChildrenJohn Laurie (1897–1980), Juno and the Paycock, Dad's ArmyJohn Le Mesurier (1912–1983), Dad's ArmyHelen Lederer (born 1954)
Robert Lindsay (born 1949), Citizen Smith, Nightingales, My FamilyRobert Llewellyn (born 1956), Red DwarfRoger Lloyd-Pack (1944–2014), Only Fools and Horses, The Vicar of DibleyArthur Lowe (1915–1982), Dad's Army, Bless Me FatherJoanna Lumley (born 1947), Absolutely FabulousNicholas Lyndhurst (born 1961), Only Fools and Horses, Butterflies, Goodnight Sweetheart'
Rik Mayall (1958–2014), The Young Ones, Bottom, The New Statesman
Greg McHugh, Gary: Tank Commander, Fresh Meat
Stephen Merchant (born 1974), The Office, Extras
David Mitchell (born 1974), Peep Show
Warren Mitchell (1926–2015), Till Death Us Do Part
Brian Murphy (born 1933), Man About the House, George and Mildred, Last of the Summer Wine
Al Murray (born 1968), Time Gentlemen Please
Paul Nicholas (born 1945), Just Good Friends
Gary Olsen (1957-2000), 2point4 Children
Bill Owen (1914–1999), Last of the Summer Wine
Geoffrey Palmer (1927–2020), The Fall and Rise of Reginald Perrin, Butterflies, As Time Goes By
Trevor Peacock (1931-2021), The Vicar of Dibley
Simon Pegg (born 1970), Spaced
Bill Pertwee (1926–2013), Dad's Army, It Ain't Half Hot Mum
John Pickard (born 1977), 2point4 Children
Caroline Quentin (born 1960), Men Behaving Badly, Kiss Me Kate
Pauline Quirke (born 1959), Birds of a Feather, Office Gossip
Tony Robinson (born 1946), Blackadder
Linda Robson (born 1958), Birds of a Feather
Leonard Rossiter (1926–1984), The Fall and Rise of Reginald Perrin, Rising Damp
Andrew Sachs (1930–2016), Fawlty Towers
Peter Sallis (1921–2017), Last of the Summer Wine
Jennifer Saunders (born 1958), Absolutely Fabulous
Julia Sawalha (born 1968), Absolutely Fabulous
Isy Suttie (born 1978), Peep Show
Eric Sykes (1923–2012), Sykes
Liza Tarbuck (born 1964), Watching, The Big Breakfast, Linda Greene, Mount Pleasant, Saxondale
Reg Varney (1916–2008), The Rag Trade, On the Buses
Gary Waldhorn (1943–2022), Brush Strokes, The Vicar of Dibley
Rudolph Walker (born 1939), Love Thy Neighbour, The Thin Blue Line
Julie Walters (born 1950), dinnerladies
Robert Webb (born 1972), Peep Show, The Smoking Room
June Whitfield (1925–2018), Terry and June, Absolutely Fabulous
Brian Wilde (1921–2008), Last of the Summer Wine, Porridge
Richard Wilson (born 1936), Only When I Laugh, One Foot in the Grave
Sir Norman Wisdom (1915–2010), Wit and Wisdom
Victoria Wood (1953-2016), dinnerladies

Spoof show comedians 

Sacha Baron Cohen, The 11 O'Clock Show, Da Ali G Show
Steve Coogan, Knowing Me, Knowing You
Daisy May Cooper, This Country
Rebecca Front, On The Hour, The Day Today, Knowing Me, Knowing You
Ricky Gervais, The Office
Matthew Holness, Garth Marenghi's Darkplace
Paul Kaye, aka Dennis Pennis
Chris Langham, People Like Us
Doon Mackichan, Brass Eye, Knowing Me, Knowing You
Chris Morris (born 1965), Brass Eye, Blue Jam, The Day Today
John Oliver, The Daily Show
Peter Serafinowicz, Look Around You, Peter Serafinowicz Show
Victoria Wood, Acorn Antiques

Stand-up comedians

A
Russ Abbot (born 1947)
James Acaster (born 1985)
Terry Alderton (born 1970)
Stephen K. Amos (born 1967)
Avril Angers (1918–2005)
Bennett Arron (born 1973)
Shaista Aziz (born 1978)
Sadia Azmat (born 1987)

B
Bill Bailey (born 1964)
Angela Barnes (born 1976)
Julian Barratt (born 1968)
Alistair Barrie
Aaron Barschak (born 1966)
Rob Beckett (born 1986)
Ninia Benjamin
Katherine Bennett (born 1976)
Danny Bhoy (born 1974)
John Bishop (born 1966)
Bethany Black (born 1978)
Adam Bloom (born 1971)
Jo Brand (born 1957)
Russell Brand (born 1975)
Jen Brister (born 1975)
Doc Brown (born 1977)
Roy 'Chubby' Brown (born 1945)

C
Rhona Cameron (born 1965)
Alan Carr (born 1976)
Jimmy Carr (born 1972)
Jasper Carrott (born 1945)
Jo Caulfield (born 1963)
Ted Chippington (born 1962)
Bridget Christie (born 1971)
Craig Charles (born 1964)
Laurence Clark (born 1974)
Julian Clary (born 1959)
Billy Connolly (born 1942)
Janice Connolly (born 1954)
Phil Cool
Nina Conti (born 1974)
Lewis Costello (born 1993)

D
Jim Davidson (born 1954)
Greg Davies (born 1968)
Jack Dee (born 1961)
Les Dennis (born 1953)
Ken Dodd (1927–2018)
Joel Dommett (born 1985)

E
Ben Elton (born 1959)
Jo Enright (born 1968)
Lee Evans (born 1964)

F
Simon Fanshawe (born 1956)
Noel Fielding (born 1973)
Micky Flanagan (born 1962)
Paul Foot (born 1973)

G
Ricky Gervais (born 1961)
Rhod Gilbert (born 1968)
Mo Gilligan (born 1988)
Janey Godley (born 1961)
Kerry Godliman (born 1973)
Dave Gorman (born 1971)
Boothby Graffoe (born 1962)
Jeff Green (born 1964)

H
Malcolm Hardee (1950–2005)
Mike Harding (born 1944)
Jeremy Hardy (1961–2019)
Natalie Haynes (born 1974)
Miranda Hart (born 1972)
Richard Herring (born 1967)
Dominic Holland (born 1967)
Rufus Hound (born 1979)
Russell Howard (born 1980)
Frankie Howerd (1917–1992)
Lee Hurst (born 1962)

I
Robin Ince (born 1969)
Eddie Izzard (born 1962)

J
Jimeoin (born 1966)
Jimmy Jones (born 1938)
Milton Jones (born 1964)
Phill Jupitus (born 1962)

K
Russell Kane (born 1975)
Peter Kay (born 1971)
Phil Kay (born 1969)
Shaparak Khorsandi (born 1973)

L
Andrew Lawrence (born 1979)
Stewart Lee (born 1968)
Sean Lock (1963-2021)
Josie Long (born 1982)
Norman Lovett (born 1946)
Joe Lycett (born 1988)

M
Lee Mack (born 1968)
Jason Manford (born 1981)
Bernard Manning (1930–2007)
Francesca Martinez (born 1978)
Michael McIntyre (born 1976)
Stephen Merchant (born 1974)
Sarah Millican (born 1975)
Shazia Mirza (born 1976)
John Moloney
Bob Monkhouse (1928–2003)
Eleanor Morton
Simon Munnery (born 1967)
Al Murray (born 1968)

N
Ross Noble (born 1976)

O
John Oliver (born 1977)
Andrew O'Neill (born 1979)
Andi Osho (born 1973)

P
Papa CJ
Sara Pascoe (born 1981)
Lee Peart (born 1990)
Sue Perkins (born 1969)
Lucy Porter (born 1973)

R
Romesh Ranganathan (born 1978)
Jon Richardson (born 1982)
Matt Richardson (born 1991)
Abi Roberts (born 1976)
George Roper (1934–2003)
Adam Rowe (born 1992)

S
Frank Skinner (born 1957)
Daniel Sloss (born 1990)
Freddie Starr (1943–2019)
Mark Steel (born 1960)
Ian Stone  (born 1963)

T
Jimmy Tarbuck (born 1940)
Ellie Taylor (born 1983)
Mackenzie Taylor (1978–2010)
Paul Taylor (born 1986)
Dave Thompson (born 1960)

V
Johnny Vegas (born 1971)
Ava Vidal (born 1976)
Andre Vincent (born 1964)
Tim Vine (born 1967)
Eros Vlahos (born 1995)

W
Oliver Wakefield (1909–1956), "The Voice of Inexperience" 
Rick Wakeman (born 1949)
Holly Walsh (born 1980)
Mark Watson (born 1980)
Jack Whitehall (born 1988)
Josh Widdicombe (born 1983)
Joe Wilkinson (born 1975)
Mike Wozniak

Y
Gina Yashere (born 1974)

Z
Andy Zaltzman (born 1974)

Comedy double acts 

Adam and Joe
Ant and Dec
Armstrong and Miller
Baddiel and Skinner
Julian Barratt and Noel Fielding
Cannon and Ball
Peter Cook and Dudley Moore
Flanagan and Allen, also appeared as part of The Crazy Gang
Flanders and Swann
French and Saunders
Frisky & Mannish
Fry and Laurie
Hale and Pace
Hinge and Bracket
Hudson and Pepperdine
Lee and Herring
Little and Large
Matt Lucas and David Walliams (Little Britain)
Mel and Sue
Mitchell and Webb
Morecambe and Wise
Naughton and Gold, also appeared as part of the Crazy Gang
Nervo and Knox, also appeared as part of the Crazy Gang
Newman and Baddiel
John Oliver and Andy Zaltzman (The Bugle)
Parsons and Naylor
Punt and Dennis
Reeves and Mortimer
Mel Smith and Griff Rhys Jones
The Two Ronnies
Watson & Oliver

Poets with a comedic bent 

Pam Ayres (born 1947)
Les Barker
Penny Broadhurst
Craig Charles
John Cooper Clarke
Ivor Cutler (1923–2006)
Cyril Fletcher (1913–2005)
John Hegley
Tim Key
Roger McGough
Henry Normal
Owen O'Neill
Lemn Sissay
Stanley Unwin (1911–2002)
Rogan Whitenails

Blog and internet humourists 
Michael Dapaah
Mo Gilligan
Dan Howell
Phil Lester
Rhodri Marsden

Cartoonists, caricaturists, etc. 

Barry Appleby (1909–1996), Skit and Skat, The Gambols
George Cruikshank (1792–1878)
Chris Donald (born 1960), Viz
James Gillray (1757–1815)
William Hogarth (1697–1764)
 Gerald Scarfe
Bill Tidy (born 1933)

Raconteurs and after-dinner speakers 

Barry Cryer (1935-2022)
Lance Percival (1933–2015)
Peter Ustinov (1921–2004)
Rick Wakeman (born 1949)
Kenneth Williams (1926–1988)

See also 

 List of British comedy films
 List of comedians
 Lists of British people

References

 
Comedians
British